Asiopsocus sonorensis is a species of insect in the family Asiopsocidae. It is found in Central America and North America.

References

Caeciliusetae
Articles created by Qbugbot
Insects described in 1976